The Reason I Exist is a studio album by Filipino singer King Girado, released in the Philippines on April 2004 by Star Records. King did the media launch for the album during his birthday together with the launch of his new music video of the carrier single "Ba't 'Di Mo Pagbigyan" and website kingedgeofrnb.com followed by a birthday show at the Hardrock cafe for his fans.

The album consists of ten tracks, including the song "Never Let You Go" with rapper Gloc-9 and Nina. Two of the songs from the album were included in ABS CBN TV series soundtrack - "Maybe" for Sana'y Wala Nang Wakas and "Ikaw ang Buhay Ko" for the Taiwanese Idol Dramas TV series Westside story in ABS-CBN. King did a duet version of "Ba't 'Di Mo Pagbigyan" with Maoi David for the Krystala soundtrack. "Will You Wait for Me" was the last song released from this album. It has reached Gold status by the Philippine Association of the Record Industry, selling over 15,000 units in the country.

Track listing
All tracks were produced by Jonathan Manalo except track 3.

Personnel

 Ian G. Castanares - cover layout and design
 Beth Faustino - A & R coordination
 Nina - lead vocals (track 6)
 Ronnie Salvacion - photography
 Jonathan Manalo - album producer
 Monina B. Quejano - A & R coordination
 Anabelle M. Regalado - executive producer
 Jonathan Manalo- vocal arrangement
 Henrich Ngo - cover concept
 Charo Santos-Concio - executive producer
 Enrico C. Santos - executive producer
 King Girado - vocals
 Nixon Sy - cover concept
 Arnold Jallores - mastering
 Nathan de Leon, Nixon Sy - stylist
 Gloc-9 - lead vocals (track 6)

Certifications

References

2004 albums